Hebrus is a genus of velvet water bugs in the family Hebridae. There are at least 160 described species in Hebrus.

See also
 List of Hebrus species

References

Further reading

 
 
 
 
 
 
 
 

Hebroidea
Gerromorpha genera